was a Japanese baseball player from Matsuyama, Ehime. An accomplished two-way player, Kaguera is one of two players (Eiji Sawamura being the other) who was inducted into the Japanese Baseball Hall of Fame after being killed in World War II. 

Kageura's team reached the finals in the 1932 National High School Baseball Championship, but his team was defeated by Masao Yoshida in the championship game. 

After getting his degree at Rikkyo University, Kageura joined the Tigers of the nascent Japanese Baseball League (JBL) and he was a good rival for Eiji Sawamura of the Giants. Kageura won the 1936 JBL ERA title with a 0.79 mark. He did not play in the JBL from 1939 to 1942, returning to the Tigers for the 1943 season (although he did not pitch that season).

Kageura was killed in the Battle of Luzon, in the Philippines, in World War II. He was inducted into the Japanese Baseball Hall of Fame by the Special Committee in 1965.

References

External links

1915 births
1945 deaths
Japanese baseball players
Hanshin Tigers players
Japanese military personnel killed in World War II
People from Matsuyama, Ehime
Rikkyo University alumni
Japanese military personnel of World War II
Japanese Baseball Hall of Fame inductees